Cabanis's spinetail (Synallaxis cabanisi) is a species of bird in the family Furnariidae. The common name and Latin binomial commemorates the German ornithologist Jean Louis Cabanis.

Range and habitat
It is found in the Andes' eastern slopes and foothills of Bolivia and Peru. Its natural habitats are subtropical or tropical moist lowland forests and heavily degraded former forest.

References

Cabanis's spinetail
Birds of the Peruvian Andes
Birds of the Bolivian Andes
Cabanis's spinetail
Taxonomy articles created by Polbot